Rajasthan State Mines & Minerals Limited (RSMML) is a public sector enterprise of the Government of Rajasthan and primarily engaged in Mining and Marketing of High Grade Rock phosphate, Lignite, Limestone & Gypsum (Non-Metallic minerals) through its mines located at various locations in Rajasthan. RSMML is a multiple location organization which originated from a private company Bikaner Gypsum limited (BGL) founded in the year 1947 in Bikaner district of Rajasthan. In 1969 after discovery of rock phosphate in Jhamarkotra (Udaipur), BGL took over operations at Jhamarkotra mines. To enhance and stabilize the profit of company, government of Rajasthan acquired majority of shares and company’s name was changed to Rajasthan state of Mines and Minerals Limited. RSMML has divided its functions according to the respective minerals. It is engaged in the mining of the 4 minerals gypsum, rock phosphate, limestone and lignite at 4 different locations.

Company Objective
The very objective of the company is to achieve cost effective technological innovations in the mining of minerals and to diversify into mineral based downstream projects. The  Company is also aiming at long term fuel supply to lignite based power projects and setting up wind energy farms at Jaisalmer.

Strategic Business Units & Profit Centers
After amalgamation, the following four mineral based Strategic Business Units & Profit Centres (SBU & PC) namely Rock Phosphate, Lignite, Gypsum and Limestone have been set up as a part of corporate restructuring: 
 Strategic Business Unit and Profit Centre – Rock Phosphate at Udaipur. Jhamarkotra Phosphate Rock Mine
 Strategic Business Unit and Profit Centre –Gypsum at Bikaner 
 Strategic Business Unit and Profit Centre – Limestone at Jodhpur 
 Strategic Business Unit and Profit Centre –Lignite at Jaipur

References 

Government-owned companies of India
Mining companies of India
State agencies of Rajasthan
Companies based in Rajasthan
Mining in Rajasthan
Organisations based in Udaipur
Economy of Udaipur
Indian companies established in 1969
1969 establishments in Rajasthan